"Suddenly Single" is a song co-written and recorded by Canadian country music artist Terri Clark.  It was released in July 1996 as the fourth and final single from her self-titled debut album. The song reached #11 on the Canadian RPM Country Tracks chart in June 1996. It also peaked at #34 on the U.S. Billboard Hot Country Singles & Tracks.  The song was written by Clark, Tom Shapiro and Chris Waters.

Chart performance
"Suddenly Single" debuted at number 54 on the U.S. Billboard Hot Country Singles & Tracks for the week of July 13, 1996.

References

1996 singles
Terri Clark songs
Songs written by Terri Clark
Songs written by Tom Shapiro
Songs written by Chris Waters
Song recordings produced by Keith Stegall
Mercury Records singles
1995 songs